Gustav Adolf Joachim Rüdiger Graf von der Goltz (8 December 1865 – 4 November 1946) was a German army general during the First World War. He commanded the Baltic Sea Division, which successfully intervened in the Finnish Civil War in the spring of 1918. Goltz stayed with his troops in Finland until December 1918 representing German interests, and in practice ruled the country as a military dictator during this period. After the Armistice of 11 November 1918, Goltz commanded the army of the local German-established government of Latvia, which in 1919 was instrumental in the defeat of the Russian Bolsheviks and their local allies in Latvia. The troops commanded by Goltz suffered a defeat against Estonia in 1919 and were eventually unsuccessful in retaining German control over Latvia and Estonia after World War I.

Early life 
Born into Von der Goltz noble family in Züllichau, Brandenburg, he was the son of Count  Gustav Albrecht von der Goltz (1831-1909) and his wife, Cäcilie von Perbandt (1839-1871).

Career 
A Major-General commanding the 1st Foot Guard Regiment in France, he was transferred to Finland in March 1918 to help the nationalist government in the civil war against the Finnish "Reds" and Soviet Russian troops. He commanded the German expedition unit ("Baltic Sea Division") which landed at Hanko, Finland, between 3 April and 5 April 1918, and then marched on the socialist-controlled capital Helsinki, which surrendered after the Battle of Helsinki on 13 April 1918. The German military intervention aided the nationalist government of Finland to gain control over most of the country by May 1918. Goltz stayed with his troops in Finland after the Civil War until December 1918 and was a major political influence in the country, described by the Quartermaster General of the White Army Hannes Ignatius as being the "true regent of Finland". In the summer of 1918, Goltz wanted to replace the Finnish White forces with a new Finnish conscript army, where all leadership positions were to be staffed by German officers and conscripts were to be trained according to German army standards. Finnish generals Ignatius, von Gerich and Theslöf resigned from the Finnish military staff in protest. The Germans wanted to use Finnish forces against the Allied units intervening in Murmansk and Arkhangelsk.

After the 11 November 1918, armistice,  von der Goltz and his division left Helsinki on 16 December 1918. The Inter-Allied Commission of Control insisted that the German troops remain in Latvia and Estonia to prevent the area from being re-occupied by the Red Army. As many of the demoralised German soldiers were being withdrawn from Latvia, a Freikorps unit called the Iron Division (Eiserne Division) was formed and deployed in Riga and used to delay the Red advance. New volunteers arriving from Germany and remnants of the German 8th Army were subsequently added to the Iron Division, which was assigned under the command of Goltz. Also, Baltic Germans and some Latvians formed the Baltische Landeswehr, led by Major Alfred Fletcher.

In late February 1919, only the seaport of Libau (Liepāja) remained in the hands of the German and Latvian forces. In March 1919, General von der Goltz was able to win a series of victories over the Red Army, first occupying Windau (Ventspils), the major port of Courland, and then advancing south and east to retake Riga.

After the Bolsheviks had been driven out from most of Latvia, the Allies ordered the German government to withdraw its troops from the Baltic region. However, the Germans succeeded in negotiating a postponement, arguing that this would have given the Bolsheviks a free hand. General von der Goltz then attempted to seize control of Latvia with the assistance of the local German population. The Latvian nationalist government was deposed while the Freikorps, Latvian and White Russian units moved on to capture Riga on May 23, 1919. The Latvian nationalists sought assistance from the Estonian army which had been occupying northern Latvia since earlier that year.

In June 1919, General von der Goltz ordered his troops not to advance east against the Red Army, as the Allies had been expecting, but north, against the Estonians. On June 19, the Iron Division and Landeswehr units launched an attack to capture areas around Wenden (Cēsis), but in the battles over the following few days, they were defeated by the 3rd Estonian Division (led by Ernst Põdder). On the morning of June 23, the Germans began a general retreat toward Riga. The Allies again insisted that the Germans withdraw their remaining troops from Latvia and intervened to impose a ceasefire between the Estonians and the Freikorps when the Latvians were about to march into Riga. The British insisted that General von der Goltz leave Latvia, and he turned his troops over to the West Russian Volunteer Army.

Count von der Goltz later claimed in his memoirs that his major strategic goal in 1919 had been to launch a campaign in cooperation with the White Russian forces to overturn the Bolshevik regime by marching on St. Petersburg and to install a pro-German anti-Bolshevist government in Russia.

As President of the United Patriotic Organizations he participated in the Harzburg Front in the early 1930s.

From 1924 to 1930, he headed a German association for the military education of the German youth named Arbeitsgemeinschaft der vaterländischen Jugend. On 17 July 1931 he handed over the command of the Economic Policy Association Frankfurt am Main to the Reich President Paul von Hindenburg.

He died on the Kinsegg estate, in the village of Bernbeuren, Germany, in 1946.

Personal life 
On 3 March 1893 in Potsdam, he was married to Hannah Caroline Helene Marie von Hase (1873–1941), daughter of Karl Alfred von Hase (1842-1914) and his wife, Countess Klara von Kalckreuth (1851-1903), paternal granddaughter of Karl August von Hase. His three sons: 
 Count Gustav Adolf Carl Joachim Rüdiger von der Goltz (1894-1976), a lawyer; married Astrid Marie Hjort (1896-1948), daughter of Prof. Dr. Johan Hjort (1869-1948) and his wife, Wanda Marie von der Marwitz (1869-1952) and had issue
 Count Hans von der Goltz (1895-1914); unmarried
 Count Georg-Conrad Gustav Dankwart Carl Gottfried von der Goltz (b. 1902); married sister of his sister-in-law, Wanda Adelheid Hjort (b. 1902) and had issue

Bibliography
 Goltz, Rüdiger von der: Meine Sendung im Finland und im Baltikum, (Leipzig, 1920)
 Bermond-Awaloff, Pavel: Im Kampf gegen den Bolschevismus. Erinnerungen von Pavel Bermond-Awaloff (Berlin, 1925)
 Bischoff, Josef: Die letzte Front. Geschichte der Eiserne Division im Baltikum 1919 (Berlin, 1935)
 Darstellungen aus den Nachkriegskämpfen deutscher Truppen und Freikorps, vol. 2: "Der Feldzug im Baltikum bis zur zweiten Einnahme von Riga. Januar bis Mai 1919", Berlin 1937; vol. 3: "Die Kämpfe im Baltikum nach der zweiten Einnahme von Riga. Juni bis Dezember 1919" (Berlin, 1938)
 Die baltische Landeswehr im Befreiungskampf gegen den Bolschevismus. Ein Gedenkbuch, herausgegeben vom baltischen Landeswehrein (Riga, 1929)
 Kiewisz, Leon: Sprawy łotewskie w bałtyckiej polityce Niemiec 1914-1919 (Posen, 1970)
 Łossowski Piotr, Między wojną a pokojem. Niemieckie zamysły wojenne na wschodzie w obliczu traktatu wersalskiego. Marzec-kwiecień 1919 (Warsaw, 1976)
 Paluszyński, Tomasz: Walka o niepodległość Łotwy 1914-1921 (Warsaw, 1999)
 Paluszyński, Tomasz: Walka o niepodległość Estonii 1914-1920 (Posen, 2007)
 Von den baltische Provinzen zu den baltischen Staaten. Beiträge zur Entstehungsgeschichte der Republiken Estland und Lettland, vol. I (1917–1918), vol. II (1919–1920) (Marburg 1971, 1977)

Notes

External links

 The name and pre-1918 data for this article seem to be garbled.
 

1865 births
1946 deaths
People from Sulechów
People of the Estonian War of Independence
Recipients of the Iron Cross (1914), 1st class
German Army generals of World War I
People of the Russian Civil War
People of the Finnish Civil War (White side)
Counts of Germany
People from the Province of Brandenburg
Major generals of Prussia
German monarchists
Recipients of the Pour le Mérite (military class)
Grand Crosses of the Order of the Cross of Liberty
20th-century Freikorps personnel
German expatriates in Finland